Kong Tau Tsuen is a village in the Shap Pat Heung area of Yuen Long District, Hong Kong.

Administration
Kong Tau Tsuen and Kong Tau San Tsuen are recognized villages under the New Territories Small House Policy.

History
At the time of the 1911 census, the population of Kong Tau was 46. The number of males was 26.

References

External links

 Delineation of area of existing village Kung Tau (Shap Pat Heung) for election of resident representative (2019 to 2022)

Villages in Yuen Long District, Hong Kong
Shap Pat Heung